Predrag Spasić (born 13 May 1965) is a Serbian retired footballer who played as a central defender.

Club career
Spasić was born in Kragujevac, PR Serbia, Yugoslavia. Over the course of his career he played for FK Radnički Kragujevac, FK Partizan, Real Madrid, CA Osasuna, CA Marbella, FK Radnički Beograd and again FK Radnički Kragujevac, retiring at the age of 32.

During his four-year spell in La Liga, Spasić amassed totals of 110 games and three goals, being relegated with Osasuna at the end of the 1993–94 season. On 19 January 1991, whilst at the service of Real Madrid, he scored an own goal in a 1–2 away loss against FC Barcelona, and was widely regarded as one of the club's worst signings.

International career
Spasić was capped 31 times for the Yugoslavia national team and scored one goal, appearing for the quarter-finalists at the 1990 FIFA World Cup (five complete matches). His debut arrived on 24 August 1988, when he played the full 90 minutes in a 2–0 friendly win in Switzerland.

References

External links

1965 births
Living people
Sportspeople from Kragujevac
Yugoslav footballers
Serbian footballers
Association football defenders
Yugoslav First League players
FK Radnički 1923 players
FK Partizan players
FK Radnički Beograd players
La Liga players
Segunda División players
Real Madrid CF players
CA Osasuna players
CA Marbella footballers
Yugoslavia international footballers
1990 FIFA World Cup players
Olympic footballers of Yugoslavia
Footballers at the 1988 Summer Olympics
Serbian expatriate footballers
Expatriate footballers in Spain
Serbian expatriate sportspeople in Spain